Minuscule 817 (in the Gregory-Aland numbering), Θε52 (von Soden), is a Greek minuscule manuscript of the New Testament written on paper, with a commentary. It was used by Erasmus. Palaeographically it has been assigned to the 15th century.

Description 
The codex contains the complete text of the four Gospels, on 255 paper leaves (size ).

The text is written in one column per page, 34–46 lines per page.

Text 
The Greek text of the codex is a representative of the Byzantine text-type. Aland did not place it in any category.

It was not examined according to the Claremont Profile Method.

It lacks the Pericope Adulterae (John 7:53–8:11).

In John 1:45 it reads Ιησουν τον υιον Ιωσηφ (Jesus, son of Joseph) along with manuscripts: Alexandrinus, Cyprius, Campianus, Macedoniensis, Sangallensis, Petropolitanus, Uncial 047, 7, 8, 196, 461, 1514, 1519; majority of the manuscripts read Ιησουν τον υιον του Ιωσηφ;

In John 4:51 it reads υιος (son) for παις (servant), the reading of the codex is supported by Codex Bezae, Cyprius, Petropolitanus Purpureus, Petropolitanus, Nanianus, 0141, 33, 194, 196, 743, 892, 1192, 1216, 1241.

History 

The manuscript was dated by Gregory to the 15th century.  The manuscript is currently dated by the INTF to the 15th century.

The early story of the manuscript and its provenance is unknown. It was held at the Dominican monastery in Basel in the beginning of the 16th century. Since 1559 it was held at the University of Basel.

Desiderius Erasmus received this codex from the Dominican friars in Basel, and used it for the first edition of his Novum Instrumentum omne (1516). Robert Estienne did not use this manuscript in his Editio Regia (1550), but his edition was based on the Erasman text. As a result, some of its readings appear in the Textus Receptus.

It was added to the list of New Testament manuscripts by Gregory (817e). Gregory saw it in 1885.

The manuscript is now housed at the Basel University Library with the shelf number A. N. III, 15.

See also 

 List of New Testament minuscules
 Biblical manuscript
 Textual criticism
 Minuscule 2

References

Further reading 

 

Greek New Testament minuscules
15th-century biblical manuscripts